Fayette County Airport  is a county-owned, public-use airport located two nautical miles (3.7 km) southwest of the central business district of Somerville, in Fayette County, Tennessee, United States. According to the FAA's National Plan of Integrated Airport Systems for 2009–2013, it was classified as a general aviation airport.

Although most U.S. airports use the same three-letter location identifier for the FAA and IATA, this airport is assigned FYE by the FAA but has no designation from the IATA.

Facilities and aircraft 
It has one runway designated 1/19 with an asphalt surface measuring 5,000 by 75 feet (1,524 x 23 m).

For the 12-month period ending August 4, 2007, the airport had 10,166 aircraft operations, an average of 27 per day: 99% general aviation, 1% air taxi, and <1% military. At that time there were 40 aircraft based at this airport: 95% single-engine and 5% multi-engine.

References

External links 
 Airport page  at Fayette County website
 Aerial photo as of 12 March 1998 from USGS The National Map
 
 

Airports in Tennessee
Buildings and structures in Fayette County, Tennessee
Transportation in Fayette County, Tennessee